Jason Bernard Zadrozny (born 20 July 1980) is a British politician from the Ashfield Independents and Leader of Ashfield District Council.

In 2007, he first became Leader of the Council as a Liberal Democrat, becoming the youngest council leader in the United Kingdom at that time, aged 26. Labour took back control at elections in 2009, but in 2018 Zadrozny regained the position as an Ashfield Independent.

He is also a member of Nottinghamshire County Council.

Early life
Zadrozny was born in Sutton-in-Ashfield, Nottinghamshire and is of Polish descent. He grew up in Kirkby-in-Ashfield attending Greenwood Primary School, Ashfield Comprehensive School, and West Nottinghamshire College, where he completed a BTeC National Diploma in Performance Art. He then obtained a Higher National Diploma in Theatre Studies from the college in 2002.

Political career
In March 2007, standing as a Liberal Democrat, Zadrozny won a by-election to Nottinghamshire County Council in the Sutton-in-Ashfield North division, with a 44% swing to his party and a 60% increase in the vote share. Two months later, also in Sutton-in-Ashfield North, he won a seat on Ashfield District Council, and the Liberal Democrats became the largest party.

Zadrozny was then Leader of Ashfield District Council from May 2007 until May 2009. In that role, he promoted Community Asset Transfers of two local buildings, the Acacia Centre in Annesley and the Manor Rooms in Teversal. His administration launched proposals for a Neighbourhood Charter of environmental pledges and the creation of new community protection services. It opened a new Lammas leisure centre in Sutton-in-Ashfield.

In May 2009, Labour took back control of Ashfield District Council and regained the leadership. In June 2009, Zadrozny held his County Council seat in the 2009 Nottinghamshire County Council election.

At the 2010 general election, Zadrozny stood as a Liberal Democrat for the parliamentary seat of Ashfield, losing to Labour's Gloria de Piero by 192 out of 48,196 votes cast, one of the closest results in the country, after the second biggest swing of the General Election.

He was re-elected to Ashfield District in 2011 and to the County Council again at its 2013 election.

In 2015, following his suspension as a member of the Liberal Democrat Party, Zadrozny left the party and was elected as an Independent for a newly created district council ward, Larwood. In November that year he formed the Ashfield Independents.

At the 2016 England and Wales police and crime commissioner elections, Zadrozny ran for the elected position of Nottinghamshire Police and Crime Commissioner.  He announced his candidacy in order to highlight his belief that he was victim of a politically motivated attack, relating to his arrest and questioning over historic child sex allegations, charges which were subsequently dropped. Zadrozny lost his £5,000 deposit, after receiving 7,164 votes (4.2%).

In May 2017, Zadrozny was elected to Nottinghamshire County Council for the new Ashfields Division as an Ashfield Independent. In that election, his party fielded candidates in five county divisions and won all five. In October 2017, there was a council by-election in Hucknall North, where his party gained the seat after the Conservative incumbent, Ben Bradley, was elected as member of parliament for Mansfield at the general election in June and resigned his council seat. In the Sutton Junction and Harlow Wood by-election of December 2018, his party won again, with 82% of the votes.

In 2018, eight councillors defected from the incumbent Labour administration to the Ashfield Independents, and Zadrozny was once again elected as Leader of Ashfield District Council. His policies include the construction of a new leisure centre with swimming pools for Kirkby-in-Ashfield, restoration of the town clock and community spring clean events.

In May 2019, Zadrozny‘s position at Ashfield District Council was secured when his new political party won all but five seats on the council.

He stood for parliament again for the seat in the 2019 general election, running for the Ashfield Independents. He came second with 27.6% of the vote.

Zadrozny has stated that he voted for the United Kingdom to leave the European Union in the 2016 membership referendum and later advocated leaving the EU as soon as possible.

Zadrozny is a member of the Local Government Association’s Fire Commission and its Resources Board.

Personal life

Zadrozny lives in Kirkby-in-Ashfield. In 2015 he was arrested and charged with historic child sex offences; three years later the case was dropped after the Crown Prosecution Service presented no evidence.

References

External links
Councillor Jason Zadrozny, ashfield-dc.gov.uk
Jason Zadrozny, nottinghamshire.gov.uk
Jason Zadrozny, lga.moderngov.co.uk

1980 births
Living people
Councillors in Nottinghamshire
Liberal Democrats (UK) councillors
Members of Nottinghamshire County Council
People from Kirkby-in-Ashfield
Leaders of local authorities of England
British people of Polish descent